Iain De Caestecker (born 29 December 1987) is a Scottish actor. He is best known for portraying Leopold Fitz/The Doctor in the television series Agents of S.H.I.E.L.D. (2013–2020). He is also known for his roles in Coronation Street (2001–2003) as Adam Barlow and the films Shell (2012), In Fear (2013), Not Another Happy Ending (2013), Lost River (2014), and Overlord (2018).

Early life
De Caestecker was born in Glasgow, Scotland. He is of Belgian descent through his paternal grandfather. He has a twin sister and two older brothers. His parents are both medical doctors. His mother, Dr Linda De Caestecker, is Director of Public Health (DPH) for NHS Greater Glasgow and Clyde, the largest health board in Scotland. She is an honorary professor at the University of Glasgow.

Iain De Caestecker went to Hillhead Primary School. He completed an HND in Acting and Performance at Langside College.

Career

De Caestecker made his professional acting debut in the BBC short film Billy and Zorba at the age of nine. This was followed by a minor role as a bully in the comedy horror film The Little Vampire. In 2010, De Caestecker made his television debut in serial drama Lip Service. The following year he first appeared as Adam Barlow in Coronation Street, the UK's longest-running and most-watched TV soap opera. He would appear in 54 episodes between 2001 and 2003 before the role was recast with an older actor.

He played the lead in BAFTA-winning BBC series The Fades and Young James Herriot; the latter earned him a nomination for a BAFTA Scotland for Best Actor/Actress – Television.

Psychological horror film In Fear premiered at the 2013 Sundance Film Festival to rave reviews. That same year, De Caestecker appeared in Filth ("I'm a big fan of Irvine Welsh and [...] I got to play all my scenes with James McAvoy which meant a lot to me") and Not Another Happy Ending; the latter earned him his second BAFTA Scotland nomination, this time in the Best Actor/Actress – Film category. He also appeared in the music video for Gabrielle Aplin's song Please Don't Say You Love Me.

On his first visit to Los Angeles, De Caestecker landed a series regular role on the Marvel television series Agents of S.H.I.E.L.D. (2013-2020). He played scientist Leo Fitz and was a part of the main cast from Seasons 1 through 6. In the seventh and final season, he appeared as a special guest star due to having "been in a warm country for five years and it didn't feel like home to me." His Agents of S.H.I.E.L.D. character was animated for an episode of Disney XD's Marvel's Ultimate Spider-Man Vs. The Sinister 6, to which the actor lent his voice.

In 2014, De Caestecker played the lead role in Ryan Gosling's directorial debut Lost River. The film premiered in competition in the Un certain regard section at the 67th Cannes Film Festival.

In 2018, De Caestecker co-starred in the J. J. Abrams-produced war horror film Overlord. The movie received two nominations at the 2019 Saturn Awards.

In 2020, De Caestecker starred as young Douglas Petersen in BBC One's four-part miniseries Us, based on David Nicholls' novel of the same name. In the same year he also starred opposite Hugh Laurie in the PBS Masterpiece/BBC One political-thriller series Roadkill. Fresh from wrapping up work on Roadkill, De Caestecker filmed horror short Upstairs. The film was played on the festival circuit around the world.

In 2022, De Caestecker led the cast of BBC One's three-part drama The Control Room. And he will make guest appearances on prestige podcast shows from French-American podcast network Paradiso Media Conference Call, along with Jeff Ward, Elizabeth Henstridge, and Clark Gregg.

Filmography

Film

Television

Video games

Music videos

Awards and nominations

References

External links

 
 Iain De Caestecker on Instagram (official)
 Iain De Caestecker on Twitter (official)

1987 births
21st-century Scottish male actors
British expatriate male actors in the United States
Living people
Male actors from Glasgow
Scottish expatriates in the United States
Scottish male child actors
Scottish male film actors
Scottish male soap opera actors
Scottish male television actors
Scottish people of Belgian descent
Scottish twins